Puerto Rico Highway 159 (PR-159) is the main road from Morovis to Toa Alta, passing through the municipality of Corozal, Puerto Rico.

Route description
This road begins in downtown Morovis, from PR-155 until the PR-165 in Toa Alta. It is about 21 km long. Among their intersections are the PR-137 (Expreso Ángel “Tony” Laureano), PR-160, PR-142 (Expreso de Corozal) and PR-164 (to Naranjito).

In Corozal, the road serves as the main access to some neighborhoods and in the downtown area the route was replaced by the PR-891, and PR-159 makes a bypass to evade the municipal center.

On this highway lies the Plaza Aquarium shopping center (in Toa Alta) and Mavilla Bridge, a centenary bridge which is located east of Corozal.

Maintenance
The issue of who is responsible for the road maintenance in Morovis was argued in April 2019. Representative Guillermo Miranda Rivera accused the mayor of Morovis, Carmen Maldonado González, of not doing road maintenance on Morovis' roads, while she blamed the central government for the condition of state roads in Morovis.

Major intersections

See also

 List of highways numbered 159

References

External links

 PR-159, Corozal, Puerto Rico
 Mavilla Bridge
 Reabre tramo de la PR-159 en Corozal 

159